The Calder Park V8 Supercar round was a V8 Supercar, and formerly Australian Touring Car Championship, motor racing event held at Calder Park Raceway in Melbourne, Victoria, Australia. The event was held 25 times between 1969 and 2001.

History

Calder Park's first championship round was the first round of the 1969 season, the first championship to be held over multiple rounds. It was won by Bob Jane who, soon after, purchased the circuit and also won the 1972 round. Allan Moffat became the most successful driver in the event's history through the 1970s and 1980s, winning five events. Peter Brock also won three consecutive events for the Holden Dealer Team from 1979 to 1981. The 1987 championship round, won by Glenn Seton, saw the world debut of, amongst others, the BMW M3 and the Ford Sierra RS Cosworth. It was the first of three major touring car races at the circuit in 1987, with a post-season endurance race and the Bob Jane T-Marts 500, a round of the World Touring Car Championship, held on the combined road circuit and oval layout. From 1989 to 1995, the circuit dropped off the calendar after a deal was struck for the circuit not to feature any tobacco sponsorship.

With tobacco advertising banned in Australia in late 1995, touring car racing returned to the circuit with a non-championship event celebrating Peter Brock in November 1995. The circuit then returned to the championship proper in 1996, and Russell Ingall began a six-year unbeaten run for Holden. Calder Park was the opening event of the 1997 season, and held the last championship night race until 2018. The round was won by Wayne Gardner, the only championship win for him and his team. The third race in 1998 was cancelled due to torrential rain. In 1999, in what was the 400th championship race of all time, a major crash at the start of the race saw Craig Lowndes barrel roll down an embankment on the side of the track, causing injuries which forced him to miss the next round at Symmons Plains Raceway. At the second attempted start, a similar but less dramatic crash saw Jason Bright fired into the wall before Turn 1. Lowndes' team-mate Mark Skaife eventually went on to win the race and the round. Mark Larkham won his only championship race victory in the second race in 2000, only three weeks after a fiery crash at the Oran Park round that wrote off his previous chassis. In what became the 25th and final event at the circuit in 2001, Paul Morris, who like Gardner and Larkham was driving for his eponymous team, won his first championship race and round.

The circuit was not included on the 2002 calendar, after a financial dispute between circuit owner Bob Jane and the series, and the circuit has since fallen into disrepair.

Winners

Multiple winners

By driver

By team

By manufacturer

Event names and sponsors
1969–83, 1987–88, 1996–2001: Calder Park 
1985: Eurovox Trophy
1986: Coca-Cola Cup

See also
 List of Australian Touring Car Championship races

References

Supercars Championship races
Motorsport in Melbourne
Sports competitions in Melbourne